MTV Entertainment Studios is the film and television production arm of MTV Entertainment Group, a subsidiary of the Paramount Media Networks division of Paramount Global. Founded in 1991 as MTV Productions, it is a consolidation of the former MTV Films group established in 1996 and the MTV Production Development/MTV Studios group of 2003–2021, it has produced original television shows like Beavis and Butt-Head, Æon Flux, Jackass, My Super Sweet 16, Daria, Celebrity Deathmatch, Clone High and The Real World and films such as Election, Joe's Apartment and Napoleon Dynamite. Its films are released by fellow Paramount Global division Paramount Pictures. The MTV Films unit was part of Paramount Players until 2020.

History 
MTV Productions started in 1991 and went into expansion two years later, with Doug Herzog serving as president of the unit. Its expansion was to produce shows for theatrical release, broadcast TV and cable, syndication and the international marketplace. MTV then signed a two-picture deal with Geffen Pictures to start making motion pictures afterwards.

Only one movie came out of the deal due to the 1994 acquisition of Paramount Pictures by MTV's parent company Viacom. Joe's Apartment, based on a short aired on MTV, came out on July 26, 1996, and grossed $4.6 million on a $13 million budget, making it a box office bomb. Shortly afterwards, MTV Productions tried for an entertainment strip Real Time, to be distributed by Viacom Enterprises, which was owned by MTV's parent Viacom, and scheduled on air for the 1994–95 season, but never materialized.

Shortly after Viacom bought out Paramount Pictures. Paramount began to distribute material from MTV and Nickelodeon. Shortly after The Arsenio Hall Show was cancelled, Paramount began distributing and producing MTV's The Jon Stewart Show for the syndication market.

In 1994, the Paramount Television Group and MTV Productions signed a deal to develop projects commissioned by MTV, and gave Paramount the right of first refusal on projects developed by MTV. By 1995, David Gale was named head of MTV Films.

MTV developed its first feature film in collaboration with Paramount Pictures, Beavis and Butt-Head Do America, based on the MTV cartoon Beavis and Butt-Head. The film grossed $63.1 million on a $12 million budget.

For the 1997–98 television season, MTV Productions dabbled in network television production, in conjunction with Paramount Network Television, sibling of Viacom, to produce the NBC comedy Jenny, the UPN (then-sister of MTV) comedy Hitz, and the WB drama Three None of these lasted more than one season.

On August 21, 1998, MTV Films has released another film, Dead Man on Campus, which starred Tom Everett Scott and Mark-Paul Gosselaar. It got negative reviews, and was a box office bomb, grossing $15.1 million on a $14 million budget.

MTV Films' next feature project, 200 Cigarettes, released on February 26, 1999, was a box office bomb, grossing $6.8 million on a $6 million budget.

In 2001, MTV produced Zoolander under the VH1 Films branding, which grossed $60.7 million on a $28 million budget.

In 2003, MTV announced a theatrical feature film adaptation of Celebrity Deathmatch, with creator Eric Fogel as writer, producer, and director, but it was cancelled by the end of the year before production could begin due to MTV being less interested in animation.

On August 21, 2006, Nickelodeon Movies, Comedy Central Films, and MTV Films became labels of the Paramount Motion Pictures Group. By 2017, Paramount Players was created as a joint venture with MTV Films, Nickelodeon Movies, and BET Films. In 2019, MTV Studios launched MTV Documentary Films, a label producing and acquiring documentary features. In 2020, MTV Films was folded into MTV Studios. The following year, MTV Studios became MTV Entertainment Studios, encompassing content for and based on all of MTV Entertainment Group's brands.

Films

Theatrically released

Direct-to-video

Streaming

Upcoming films

Television

Television series

Television specials

Television movies

Awards and nominations

Academy Awards

References 

Film production companies of the United States
Television production companies of the United States
Mass media companies established in 1996
Paramount Global subsidiaries
Companies based in California
Paramount Pictures